Triatoma indictiva is an arthropod in the assassin bug family of Reduviidae, and is an important vector of Trypanosoma cruzi. T. cruzi is the protozoan that causes Chagas Disease, which affects approximately eight million people a year in the western hemisphere alone. Triatoma indictiva is found in Mexico and throughout the southern United States, including Arizona and Texas.

Physical characteristics and development 

T. inductiva are paurometabolous and undergo 3 life stages including: egg, nymph and adult. The head and thorax of T. inductiva are black except for the red markings of its side and the slightly lighter colored third section of the leg. T. indictiva has a narrow head and tri-segmented antennae, with black forewings that cover the abdomen.

Habitat 
Triatoma indictiva are generally nidicolous (born immature) and are found in wooded areas or birds nests, but also can be found inside a house or other man-made structures. T. indictiva has been reported in Mexico, Arizona, and Texas. It is believed that T. indictiva is more commonly found in dwellings in Mexico and poorer regions, because it is easier for a colony to form in an open residence, bringing them more frequently into contact with people. Due to the fact that T. indictiva is established throughout much of Mexico, especially in areas with poor economic conditions, they are difficult to manage.

Feeding 

Triatoma indictiva are hematophagous (blood-sucking) and mainly feed on mammals, including humans, but they also feed on birds and reptiles. In their nymphal stages, T. indictiva can easily switch between vertebrate and invertebrate hosts, but the reasons that cause the switch is currently unknown. Adult T. indictiva, when feeding on humans bite around the lips or face, which is how the term "kissing bug" was formed. This is dangerous because, T. indictiva occasionally defecate during or after a blood meal, which can leave behind fecal matter containing T. cruzi.

Vector of Chagas disease 

T. indictiva is one of the main vectors of T. cruzi, the hemoflagellate protozoan that causes Chagas disease. T. cruzi is transmitted through infectious feces left by T. indictiva after a blood meal. T. cruzi then usually enters the vertebrate by contaminating the bite site or through a nearby mucous membrane. Enzootic infection is prevalent across the southern United States, where there are 24 reservoir species and triatomine vectors, including T. indictiva reported in 28 states. Only 7 autochthonous human cases of Chagas disease have been reported in the U.S. from 1955-2006, which is considerably lower than the rates in Central and South America. Fewer locally-acquired human Chagas disease cases in the U.S. is presumably due to better awareness and better economic conditions keeping the vectors outside the home. Triatoma spp. in the U.S., including T. indictiva, have slower times for defecation following a blood meal compared to South American species, which could be an additional reason reducing the risk of acquiring Chagas disease in the U.S.

References

Further reading 
 (WHO) World Health Organization. 2008. The global burden of disease: 2004 update. World Health Organization, Geneva, Switzerland.
 "ITIS Standard Report." ITIS Standard Report. N.p., 04 Nov. 2013. Web. 04 Nov. 2013.
 +Swanson, D. R. 2011. New state records and distributional notes for some assassin bugs of the continental United States (Heteroptera: Reduviidae). The Great Lakes Entomologist 44(3–4): 117–138.
 Henry, Thomas J., and Richard C. Froeschner. Catalog of the Heteroptera, or True Bugs, of Canada and the Continental United States. Leiden: E.J. Brill, 1988. Print.
 The Common Insects of North America Lester A. Swan, Charles S. Papp. 1972. Harper & Row.
 Rassi, A., Jr., A. Rassi, and J. A. Marin-Neto. 2010. Chagas disease. Lancet 375: 1388–1402. CrossRef, PubMed
 Coin, Patrick. "Genus Triatoma - Bloodsucking Conenoses." Welcome to BugGuide.Net! - BugGuide.Net. Iowa State University Entomology, 11 Dec. 2010. Web. 04 Nov. 2013.
 Identification of Bloodmeal Sources and Trypanosoma cruzi Infection in Triatomine Bugs (Hemiptera: Reduviidae) From Residential Settings in Texas, the United States Sonia A. Kjos Journal of Medical Entomology (2013), 50(5):1126
 Coura, J. R., and J. C. Dias. 2009. Epidemiology, control and surveillance of Chagas disease: 100 years after its discovery. Mem. Inst. Oswaldo Cruz 104 (Suppl. 1): 31–40. PubMed
 Bern, C., S. P. Montgomery, L. Katz, S. Caglioti, and S. L. Strainer. 2008. Chagas disease and the US blood supply. Curr. Opin. Infect. Dis. 21: 476–482. CrossRef, PubMed

External links 
 
 ADW
 

Reduviidae
Insect vectors of human pathogens
Hemiptera of North America
Insects described in 1912